2005 Emmy Awards may refer to:

 57th Primetime Emmy Awards, the 2005 Emmy Awards ceremony honoring primetime programming during June 2004 – May 2005
 32nd Daytime Emmy Awards, the 2005 Emmy Awards ceremony honoring daytime programming during 2004
 26th Sports Emmy Awards, the 2005 Emmy Awards ceremony honoring sports programming during 2004
 33rd International Emmy Awards, honoring international programming

Emmy Award ceremonies by year